Patrick Bailey (born November 19, 1985) is a former American football linebacker. He was signed as an undrafted free agent in 2008 by the Pittsburgh Steelers of the National Football League (NFL). Against the Arizona Cardinals, Bailey won Super Bowl XLIII with the Steelers. He graduated in 2004 from Alamo Heights High School in San Antonio and played college football at Duke. He also played for the Tennessee Titans.

Professional career

Pittsburgh Steelers
After spending the first two games of the 2008 season on the Steelers' practice squad, Bailey was signed to the active roster on September 20 after the team waived running back Gary Russell. Bailey made a solo special teams tackle against the Philadelphia Eagles in his first NFL game, and followed that up with two solo tackles on special teams against the Baltimore Ravens. He injured his hamstring playing against the Ravens, and was listed as questionable for the Week 5 game.

Bailey was waived on October 4 when the team signed practice squad defensive tackle Scott Paxson to the active roster. He was re-signed to the practice squad the following day, rejoining the active roster soon after. Bailey earned the Steelers rookie of the year award for his play on special teams.

He played special teams and registered a tackle in the Steelers victory over the Arizona Cardinals in Super Bowl XLIII on February 1, 2009.

He was cut on September 4, 2010, during the Steelers' final roster cuts.

Tennessee Titans
On September 5, 2010, Bailey was claimed off waivers by the Tennessee Titans.

On September 1, 2014, Bailey was waived by the Titans to clear a roster space for Quentin Groves.

Asurion

On September 11, 2017 Bailey began his career as a Sr Pricing Analyst.  3 years later Bailey continues to excel, having received 2 promotions, and is now a Senior Manager of Pricing.

Personal life
Bailey and his wife Maggie live in Nashville, Tennessee and Elmendorf, Texas.

References

External links
Duke Blue Devils bio
Pittsburgh Steelers bio

1985 births
Living people
Pittsburgh Steelers players
Players of American football from San Antonio
American football defensive ends
American football linebackers
Duke Blue Devils football players
Tennessee Titans players